Carex hirtifolia, the pubescent sedge, is a species of sedge native to northeastern North America. It is the only species in Carex section Hirtifoliae. The entire plant is distinctively covered soft hairs.

Description
Plants of C. hirtifolia are shortly rhizomatous, forming loose tufts.

References

hirtifolia
Flora of North America
Plants described in 1910